O'Shea is an Australian country music duo composed of Mark (born 16 February 1977) and Jay (previously Kylie Smith) (born 17 January 1974). The duo commenced in 2007 and after relocating to Nashville in 2007, the duo has seen success as artists and songwriters, with nine #1 singles on the Australian country charts, as well as finishing fifth in the Country Music Television 2009 series Can You Duet. The duo have released four studio albums, all of which have peaked inside the ARIA top 50.

O'Shea hosts O'Shea USA, a television show on Foxtel's Country Music Channel.

Solo careers

1977-2007: Mark's solo career and Zinc

Originally from Dalby, Queensland, Mark's musical career commenced at the age of seventeen when he won the Gympie Music Muster talent competition in 1993, which subsequently led to a record deal.

Mark's debut album was honored with two Golden Guitar Awards from the CMAA for Best New Talent of the Year (1996) for the track "The Swimming Song" and Best Video (1997) for "The Dreamer".

In 2002, Mark formed the rock/pop group Zinc with brother John O'Shea and Adam Ray. The band released one studio album in 2005 and disbanded in 2007. In 2006, Mark toured as a guitarist for Ronn Moss.

1974-2007: Jay's solo career
Jay was involved in performing arts from a young age, touring the UK and Europe with the Australian Dance-Drill team at age 15.

In 2003 Jay signed her first publishing deal with Warner Chappell London. While working in London, Jay co-wrote "Rutinas" with Wendy Page and Jim Marr. The song became the hit single on Chenoa's album Nada Es Igual and reached No. 1 on the Spanish chart in 2005.

O'Shea

2007–2010: The Formative Years 
In 2007, Mark and Jay moved to Nashville, Tennessee and began performing as a duo and provided support act for artists including Phil Vassar, Jimmy Wayne, Sara Evans, and the Oak Ridge Boys.

In 2010, the pair began hosting their own TV show called O'Shea USA which aired on Australia's Country Music Channel (CMC).

2011–2013: Mr. and Mrs.
In 2011, the duo signed with Sony Music Australia and released their debut studio album Mr. and Mrs. The album featured 11 tracks written/co-written by the duo alongside Nashville co-writers Dave Berg, Josh Leo, and Georgia Middleman and debuted at No. 9 on the ARIA Charts.

In 2011, O'Shea performed at CMC Rocks the Hunter and hosted the DVD coverage of the event.

In 2012, O'Shea being won th 2012 CMAA New Talent of the Year Award.

2013–2017: One + One & The Famine and the Feast
In 2013, Their second studio album One + One debuted at number 3 on the ARIA Country Charts and peaked inside the top 30 on the all genre chart.

In 2015, the duo's album The Famine and the Feast reached number 36 on the ARIA Charts, and number 1 on the ARIA Country Albums chart.

2017–Present: 61-615 
In 2017, O'Shea released the studio album 61-615, which reached number 16 on the ARIA charts. The album's first single, "Start Over", written by Mark, Jay, and singer-songwriter Alex Lloyd, peaked at #1 on The Music Network's national Country Airplay chart.

Personal lives
Mark and Jay became a couple in 1996 and married in 2004. They have two daughters.

In 2014 Jay collaborated with her birth father, Midnight Oil drummer Rob Hirst on "The Truth Walks Slowly". Jay met Hirst in 2010 following a long search for her birth parents, after they gave her up for adoption when they were teenagers.

Mark is a keen angler.

Charitable work 
Mark and Jay O'Shea have contributed their talents to the charitable organizations such as World Vision and HeartKids.

Discography

Albums

Awards and nominations

APRA Awards
The APRA Awards are presented annually from 1982 by the Australasian Performing Right Association (APRA), "honouring composers and songwriters". They commenced in 1982.

! 
|-
| 2012
| "Meant to Be" (Kim Carnes, Mark O’Shea, Jay Smith)
| Country Work of the Year
| 
|-
| rowspan="2"| 2014 
| "Be with You Tonight" (Tim Nichols, Jay O’Shea, Mark O’Shea)
| rowspan="2"| Country Work of the Year
| rowspan="2" 
| rowspan="2"| 
|-
| "Thank You Angles" (Jay O’Shea, Mark O’Shea, Matthew Scullion)

ARIA Music Awards
The ARIA Music Awards are a set of annual ceremonies presented by Australian Recording Industry Association (ARIA), which recognise excellence, innovation, and achievement across all genres of the music of Australia. They commenced in 1987.  

|-
| 2017
| 61-615
| Best Country Album
| 
|-

Country Music Awards of Australia
The Country Music Awards of Australia (CMAA) (also known as the Golden Guitar Awards) is an annual awards night held in January during the Tamworth Country Music Festival, celebrating recording excellence in the Australian country music industry. They have been held annually since 1973.

|-
| 2012
| O'Shea
| New Talent of the Year
| 
|-
| 2014
| "Thank You Angels"
| Group or Duo of the Year
| 
|-
| 2017
| "The Truth Walks Slowly (In the Country Side)" (featuring Rob Hirst)
| CMC Video Clip of the Year
| 

 Note: wins only

References

External links
 
 

2007 establishments in Australia
Australian country music groups
Australian musical duos
American country music groups
Country music duos
Male–female musical duos
Married couples
Musical groups established in 2007
Musical groups from Nashville, Tennessee
People from the Darling Downs
Sony Music Australia artists